Limithana  is a village development committee in Parbat District in the Dhawalagiri Zone of western Nepal. At the time of the 1991 Nepal census it had a population of 1596 people living in 310 individual households.

References

External links
 UN map of the municipalities of Parbat District

Populated places in Parbat District